The National Emblem of Bangladesh ( Bangladesher Jatiyô Pratik) is a national emblem of the People's Republic of Bangladesh which is used by the Government of Bangladesh and its agencies. The emblem appears on official government documents and currency.

The emblem was adopted shortly after independence in 1971. In the centre is a water lily, that is bordered on two sides by rice sheaves. Above the water lily are four stars and three connected jute leaves. The water lily is the country's national flower, and is representative of the many rivers that run through Bangladesh. Rice represents its presence as the staple food of Bangladesh, and for the agriculture of that nation. The four stars symbolise the four founding principles of the Republic that were enshrined in the Constitution of Bangladesh: nationalism, socialism, democracy, secularism.

The details of the emblem are inscribed in the constitution:

Gallery

See also
Flag of Bangladesh
Government Seal of Bangladesh

References

Bangladesh
National symbols of Bangladesh
Bangladesh
Bangladesh
Bangladesh